Sky Comedy is a British pay television channel owned and operated by Sky, a division of Comcast, which launched on 27 January 2020, replacing Universal TV. It is the first dedicated full-time comedy station in Sky's channel portfolio since the closure of The Comedy Channel in 1992.

Sky Comedy broadcasts imported programming from US networks such as corporate sibling NBC plus premium channels HBO and Showtime, broadcasting classic sitcoms as well as comedy films, live stand-up and talk shows. From 1 September 2021 onwards, Sky Comedy started airing the comedy output previously shown on Sky One, which closed to make way for two new channels, Sky Showcase and Sky Max.

Sky Comedy launched in Germany, Austria and Switzerland on 1 April 2021.



Current programming
Sky Comedy currently broadcasts a variety of comedy series, both on live TV and on-demand.

Comedy
 Code 404 (series 2–3) (2021–present)
 Breeders (series 3–4) (2022–present)
 Upright (series 2) (2022)
 Rosie Molloy Gives Up Everything (2022)
 Romantic Getaway (2023)

Upcoming programming

Comedy
 Mr Bigstuff (2023)
 Safe Space (2023)
 Smothered (2023)

Former programming

Comedy
 Bloods (2021–22)
 Hitmen (series 2) (2021)
 Avenue 5 (series 2) (2022)

Acquired programming
U.S. imports include series from ABC, CBS, HBO, NBC and Showtime among others.

 A Black Lady Sketch Show
 American Auto
 And Just Like That...
 The Conners
 Curb Your Enthusiasm
 The Late Late Show with James Corden
 Last Week Tonight with John Oliver
 Miracle Workers
 Random Acts of Flyness
 Real Time with Bill Maher
 The Righteous Gemstones
 Saturday Night Live
 Somebody Somewhere
 Sort Of
 The Tonight Show Starring Jimmy Fallon
 Young Rock

Second-run programming
The majority of acquired programming listed below previously aired on Sky Atlantic unless stated otherwise.

 Ballers
 Barry
 The Brink
 The Comeback
 Enlightened
 Entourage
 Futurama
 Girls
 Hello Ladies
 House of Lies
 I'm Dying Up Here
 In the Long Run
 Kidding
 Looking
 The Rehearsal
 The Reluctant Landlord
 Room 104
 Silicon Valley
 Togetherness
 Trollied
 Veep
 Vice Principals
 Yonderland

Repeat programming

 30 Rock
 A.P. Bio
 Black Monday
 Eastbound & Down
 Everybody Hates Chris
 Flatbush Misdemeanors
 The Fresh Prince Of Bel-Air
 Hung
 Insecure
 Los Espookys
 The Mindy Project
 Modern Family
 Moonbase 8
 Mr. Mayor
 Mrs. Fletcher
 The Office
 Our Cartoon President
 Parks and Recreation
 PEN15
 Run
 Sex and the City
 Sunnyside
 Wellington Paranormal
 Will & Grace
 Work in Progress

Notes

References

See also
 List of television stations in the United Kingdom

Sky television channels
Comedy television networks
Television channels and stations established in 2020
English-language television stations in the United Kingdom
Television channels in the United Kingdom
2020 establishments in the United Kingdom
2020s in comedy